Jack Williams (31 January 1902 – 14 October 1976) was an Australian rules footballer who played with Geelong in the Victorian Football League (VFL).

Local boy Jack Williams played his first season in 1925 and finished the year in Geelong's inaugural premiership winning side. He spent most of his career either on a wing or across halfback and played in another premiership in 1931. Williams represented the Victorian interstate team on one occasion. He retired in 1934 but returned to Geelong in 1945 as coach for a season, which brought just two wins.

References

External links

1902 births
1976 deaths
Australian rules footballers from Victoria (Australia)
Geelong Football Club players
Geelong Football Club Premiership players
Geelong Football Club coaches
Geelong West Football Club players
Two-time VFL/AFL Premiership players